Kennya Kinda Esther Cordner (born 11 November 1988) is a Tobagonian professional footballer who plays as a forward for  Turkey  Kadinlar Super Lig   club  Fenerbahce  and the Trinidad and Tobago women's national team.

Previously Seattle Sounders Women in the W-League,  the Brisbane Roar FC of Australia's W-League as well as the Northampton Laurels FC and Seattle Reign FC in the National Women's Soccer League (NWSL).

Early life
Cordner grew up in Speyside, Tobago where she attended Signal Hill Secondary Comprehensive. It was at Signal Hill where she was introduced to football.

Young Harris College
Cordner attended Young Harris College, a private university located in the state of Georgia in the United States. In 2006, she scored 18 goals and provided nine assists in the 13 games that she played for the Mountain Lions. In 2007, she played in 17 matches, scoring 37 goals, serving 13 assists for a total of 87 points for the season – the highest in the program.

Playing career

Club

Northampton Laurels FC
In 2006, Cordner signed with the Northampton Laurels FC in the WPSL, the highest division of women's professional soccer available in the United States at the time. At the time of her signing, the team was ranked third in the WPSL Eastern Conference – South Division. With Cordner's game-winning goal over top-seeded side Adirondack Lynx, she helped secure Northampton's place in the playoffs.

Kvarnsvedens IK
Cordner signed with Swedish side, Kvarnsvedens IK, for part of the 2009 season. She scored five goals for the squad.

Brisbane Roar
Cordner signed with the Brisbane Roar FC in late 2010 for the remaining two months of the 2010–2011 season. Of her signing she stated, "The quality of football here (in Australia) is much higher than that of my previous encounters, apart from national duty, and I am sure it will improve my game. This means a whole lot for my career because not only do I have the opportunity to become a better player, but set a standard be a role model for the younger players coming up." She made four appearances playing a total of 99 minutes and scored one goal helping the Roar ultimately win the 2010–2011 W-League Championship.

San Juan Jabloteh FC
Cordner played for San Juan Jabloteh FC of the Lucky Bakery Women's Super League in the summer of 2011. During a match against the Arima Giants, she scored seven goals launching the team to the top of the league standings. During another match against the Tunapuna Titans, she scored nine goals.

Seattle Reign FC Reserves 
Cordner signed with Issaquah SC, the reserve team for the NWSL's Seattle Reign FC for the 2013 season. During her debut with the team, she scored two goals against Emerald City FC.

Seattle Reign FC 
On 19 June 2013, it was announced that Cordner had signed with the Seattle Reign FC part way through the inaugural season of the National Women's Soccer League. Of the signing, Reign FC head coach Laura Harvey said, "At every level she has played Kennya has shown she knows how to find the net. We are clearly a club that is in need of a player who can consistently deliver goals, so we are excited to see the impact Kennya can have in the NWSL." Cordner made two appearances for the club and was waived in mid-July to make way another international player on the squad. NWSL rules allow only two international players on a team.

Sportivo Limpeño
In 2016, Cordner joined Paraguayan team Sportivo Limpeño, integrating into the squad with her compatriot with Kimika Forbes.

International career
Cordner made her first appearance for the Trinidad and Tobago women's national football team at age 15. She is a leading scorer for the team. In July 2011, she scored nine goals during the Women's Olympic Football Qualifying match against Dominica leading the Trinidad and Tobagonian squad to a 15–1 win.

International goals
Scores and results list Trinidad and Tobago' goal tally first.

Honors and awards
2005 Trinidad and Tobago Female Footballer of the Year
2010 Trinidad and Tobago Female Footballer of the Year

References

External links

1988 births
Living people
Women's association football forwards
Trinidad and Tobago women's footballers
Trinidad and Tobago women's international footballers
Pan American Games competitors for Trinidad and Tobago
Footballers at the 2011 Pan American Games
Footballers at the 2015 Pan American Games
Competitors at the 2010 Central American and Caribbean Games
Competitors at the 2014 Central American and Caribbean Games
Young Harris Mountain Lions women's soccer players
A-League Women players
Brisbane Roar FC (A-League Women) players
National Women's Soccer League players
OL Reign players
Seattle Sounders Women players
Toppserien players
SK Brann Kvinner players
Fenerbahçe S.K. women's football players
Turkish Women's Football Super League players
Trinidad and Tobago expatriate women's footballers
Trinidad and Tobago expatriate sportspeople in the United States
Expatriate women's soccer players in the United States
Trinidad and Tobago expatriate sportspeople in Sweden
Expatriate women's footballers in Sweden
Trinidad and Tobago expatriate sportspeople in Australia
Expatriate women's soccer players in Australia
Trinidad and Tobago expatriate sportspeople in Paraguay
Expatriate women's footballers in Paraguay
Trinidad and Tobago expatriate sportspeople in Norway
Expatriate women's footballers in Norway
Trinidad and Tobago expatriate sportspeople in Turkey
Expatriate women's footballers in Turkey